NCOR is the National Conference on Organized Resistance.

NCOR may also refer to: 
 Nuclear receptor co-repressor 1 (NCOR1), a protein
 Nuclear receptor co-repressor 2 (NCOR2), a protein